Al-Huda School was an Islamic school located in Paterson, New Jersey. Al-Huda School officially closed down in 2014.

The school served students in grades PreK-12. As of the 2009–10 school year, the school had an enrollment of 104 students (plus 12 in pre-K) and 11.5 classroom teachers (on an FTE basis), for a student-teacher ratio of 9.0:1.

References

Private elementary schools in New Jersey
Education in Paterson, New Jersey
Islamic schools in New Jersey
Private middle schools in New Jersey
Private high schools in Passaic County, New Jersey